Gourley Township is a civil township of Menominee County in the U.S. state of Michigan. The population was 409 at the 2000 census.

Gourley Township was established in 1920.

Geography

Demographics
As of the census of 2000, there were 409 people, 166 households, and 124 families residing in the township.  The population density was 11.4 per square mile (4.4/km2).  There were 222 housing units at an average density of 6.2 per square mile (2.4/km2).  The racial makeup of the township was 89.98% White, 0.24% African American, 7.33% Native American, and 2.44% from two or more races. Hispanic or Latino of any race were 1.71% of the population.

There were 166 households, out of which 32.5% had children under the age of 18 living with them, 65.1% were married couples living together, 7.2% had a female householder with no husband present, and 25.3% were non-families. 21.1% of all households were made up of individuals, and 7.2% had someone living alone who was 65 years of age or older.  The average household size was 2.46 and the average family size was 2.82.

In the township the population was spread out, with 24.2% under the age of 18, 7.6% from 18 to 24, 29.6% from 25 to 44, 22.7% from 45 to 64, and 15.9% who were 65 years of age or older.  The median age was 37 years. For every 100 females, there were 104.5 males.  For every 100 females age 18 and over, there were 108.1 males.

The median income for a household in the township was $27,063, and the median income for a family was $31,563. Males had a median income of $33,750 versus $23,125 for females. The per capita income for the township was $14,215.  About 9.3% of families and 14.5% of the population were below the poverty line, including 17.3% of those under age 18 and 22.6% of those age 65 or over.

References

Notes

Sources

Townships in Menominee County, Michigan
Marinette micropolitan area
1920 establishments in Michigan
Townships in Michigan